This was the first edition of the tournament.

Nao Hibino won the title, defeating Jessica Pegula in the final, 6–0, 6–2

Seeds

Draw

Finals

Top half

Bottom half

References
Main Draw

2018 ITF Women's Circuit
2018 Singles